The YouTube Music Awards (commonly abbreviated as YTMA) is an awards show presented by YouTube to honor the best in the music video medium.

History
The 2013 edition of the YTMAs were held at Pier 36 in New York City and were broadcast live at Youtube.com/YTMA. The live award show was preceded by a series of events all-day in locations around the world; including Seoul, Moscow, Rio de Janeiro, and London, respectively. Performers included Arcade Fire, Lindsey Stirling, Tyler, The Creator, M.I.A., Lady Gaga and Eminem, among others. The award show started at 6pm EST and was scheduled for 90 minutes.

Fans voted in each category by sharing specific links from the Youtube.com/YTMA on either their Facebook, Google+ or Twitter accounts or by video views for nominees. The video with the most views, shares, comments, and/or likes in each category was determined the winner. Artist of the Year was won by Eminem and Video of the Year was won by Girls' Generation for their video "I Got a Boy".

The 2013 edition was directed by Spike Jonze. The show was mostly unscripted because Jonze wanted the show to "..feel like a YouTube video — the raw messiness of making stuff..."

The winners of the 2015 edition of the award show were announced on March 2, 2015. Fifty winners were chosen based on the "growth in views, subscribers, and engagement over the last six months."

With that Youtube personally gives out plaque/button for milestones reached on subscriber counts. These can be reached through the videos.

Gold Diamond Play Plaque - 1,000,000 Subscriber Count 

Diamond Play Button - 10,000,000 Subscriber Count 

Red Diamond Play Button - 100,000,000 Subscriber Count

List of ceremonies

Awards
 Breakthrough of the Year
 Response of the Year 
 Innovation of the Year 
 YouTube Phenomenon 
 Video of the Year 
 Artist of the Year

References

External links
 

2013 establishments in the United States
2015 disestablishments in the United States
Awards disestablished in 2015
Awards established in 2013
American music awards
Music Awards